Ángeles Álvarez Álvarez (born 12 February 1961) is a Spanish politician and feminist activist. She is a deputy for  Madrid in the XII Legislature is currently a spokesperson for equality of the PSOE in the Congress of Deputies. She has a long history in defense of the women's rights. In 1999, she was the author of a pioneering guide on gender violence. 

Álvarez and Teresa Heredero were the first two lesbians to marry in Madrid in 2005 is a ceremony carried out by Pedro Zerolo. She was the first member of Cortes Generales to openly come out as lesbian in 2013.

References

1961 births
Lesbian politicians
LGBT legislators in Spain
Living people
Madrid city councillors (2007–2011)
Members of the 10th Congress of Deputies (Spain)
Members of the 12th Congress of Deputies (Spain)
People from the Province of Zamora
Spanish feminists
Women members of the Congress of Deputies (Spain)